Vasilyevsky (masculine), Vasilyevskaya (feminine), or Vasilyevskoye (neuter) is the name of several rural localities in Russia.

Republic of Bashkortostan
As of 2010, one rural locality in the Republic of Bashkortostan bears this name:
Vasilyevsky, Republic of Bashkortostan, a khutor in Mrakovsky Selsoviet of Kugarchinsky District

Irkutsk Oblast
As of 2010, two rural localities in Irkutsk Oblast bear this name:
Vasilyevsky, Irkutsk Oblast, a settlement in Bodaybinsky District
Vasilyevskoye, Irkutsk Oblast, a village in Nukutsky District

Ivanovo Oblast
As of 2010, three rural localities in Ivanovo Oblast bear this name:
Vasilyevskoye, Ivanovsky District, Ivanovo Oblast, a village in Ivanovsky District
Vasilyevskoye, Privolzhsky District, Ivanovo Oblast, a village in Privolzhsky District
Vasilyevskoye, Shuysky District, Ivanovo Oblast, a selo in Shuysky District

Kaluga Oblast
As of 2010, three rural localities in Kaluga Oblast bear this name:
Vasilyevskoye, Dzerzhinsky District, Kaluga Oblast, a village in Dzerzhinsky District
Vasilyevskoye, Medynsky District, Kaluga Oblast, a village in Medynsky District
Vasilyevskoye, Mosalsky District, Kaluga Oblast, a village in Mosalsky District

Kirov Oblast
As of 2010, three rural localities in Kirov Oblast bear this name:
Vasilyevsky, Kirov Oblast, a settlement under the administrative jurisdiction of the town of Omutninsk, Omutninsky District
Vasilyevskoye, Kirov Oblast, a selo in Vasilyevsky Rural Okrug of Nemsky District
Vasilyevskaya, Kirov Oblast, a village in Ichetovkinsky Rural Okrug of Afanasyevsky District

Kostroma Oblast
As of 2010, six rural localities in Kostroma Oblast bear this name:
Vasilyevskoye, Buysky District, Kostroma Oblast, a village in Tsentralnoye Settlement of Buysky District
Vasilyevskoye, Chukhlomsky District, Kostroma Oblast, a village in Nozhkinskoye Settlement of Chukhlomsky District
Vasilyevskoye, Dmitriyevskoye Settlement, Galichsky District, Kostroma Oblast, a village in Dmitriyevskoye Settlement of Galichsky District
Vasilyevskoye, Orekhovskoye Settlement, Galichsky District, Kostroma Oblast, a village in Orekhovskoye Settlement of Galichsky District
Vasilyevskoye, Manturovsky District, Kostroma Oblast, a village in Podvigalikhinskoye Settlement of Manturovsky District
Vasilyevskoye, Sharyinsky District, Kostroma Oblast, a village in Ivanovskoye Settlement of Sharyinsky District

Kursk Oblast
As of 2010, one rural locality in Kursk Oblast bears this name:
Vasilyevsky, Kursk Oblast, a settlement in Krasnoznamensky Selsoviet of Kastorensky District

Leningrad Oblast
As of 2010, one rural locality in Leningrad Oblast bears this name:
Vasilyevskaya, Leningrad Oblast, a village in Vinnitskoye Settlement Municipal Formation of Podporozhsky District

Mari El Republic
As of 2010, one rural locality in the Mari El Republic bears this name:
Vasilyevskoye, Mari El Republic, a selo in Vasilyevsky Rural Okrug of Yurinsky District

Moscow Oblast
As of 2010, ten rural localities in Moscow Oblast bear this name:
Vasilyevskoye, Kolyubakinskoye Rural Settlement, Ruzsky District, Moscow Oblast, a village in Kolyubakinskoye Rural Settlement of Ruzsky District
Vasilyevskoye, Volkovskoye Rural Settlement, Ruzsky District, Moscow Oblast, a village in Volkovskoye Rural Settlement of Ruzsky District
Vasilyevskoye, Serebryano-Prudsky District, Moscow Oblast, a village in Uzunovskoye Rural Settlement of Serebryano-Prudsky District
Vasilyevskoye, Sergiyevo-Posadsky District, Moscow Oblast, a selo in Vasilyevskoye Rural Settlement of Sergiyevo-Posadsky District
Vasilyevskoye, Serpukhovsky District, Moscow Oblast, a village in Vasilyevskoye Rural Settlement of Serpukhovsky District
Vasilyevskoye, Shakhovskoy District, Moscow Oblast, a village in Ramenskoye Rural Settlement of Shakhovskoy District
Vasilyevskoye, Shchyolkovsky District, Moscow Oblast, a village under the administrative jurisdiction of the town of Shchyolkovo, Shchyolkovsky District
Vasilyevskoye, Stupinsky District, Moscow Oblast, a selo under the administrative jurisdiction of the work settlement of Malino, Stupinsky District
Vasilyevskoye, Chismenskoye Rural Settlement, Volokolamsky District, Moscow Oblast, a village in Chismenskoye Rural Settlement of Volokolamsky District
Vasilyevskoye, Yaropoletskoye Rural Settlement, Volokolamsky District, Moscow Oblast, a village in Yaropoletskoye Rural Settlement of Volokolamsky District

Nizhny Novgorod Oblast
As of 2010, two rural localities in Nizhny Novgorod Oblast bear this name:
Vasilyevskoye, Gorodetsky District, Nizhny Novgorod Oblast, a village in Timiryazevsky Selsoviet of Gorodetsky District
Vasilyevskoye, Voskresensky District, Nizhny Novgorod Oblast, a village in Nakhratovsky Selsoviet of Voskresensky District

Novgorod Oblast
As of 2010, one rural locality in Novgorod Oblast bears this name:
Vasilyevskoye, Novgorod Oblast, a village in Rakomskoye Settlement of Novgorodsky District

Novosibirsk Oblast
As of 2010, one rural locality in Novosibirsk Oblast bears this name:
Vasilyevsky, Novosibirsk Oblast, a settlement in Chulymsky District

Oryol Oblast
As of 2010, three rural localities in Oryol Oblast bear this name:
Vasilyevsky, Bolkhovsky District, Oryol Oblast, a settlement in Novosinetsky Selsoviet of Bolkhovsky District
Vasilyevsky, Dmitrovsky District, Oryol Oblast, a settlement in Dolbenkinsky Selsoviet of Dmitrovsky District
Vasilyevsky, Verkhovsky District, Oryol Oblast, a settlement in Vasilyevsky Selsoviet of Verkhovsky District

Perm Krai
As of 2010, one rural locality in Perm Krai bears this name:
Vasilyevskoye, Perm Krai, a selo in Ilyinsky District

Pskov Oblast
As of 2010, two rural localities in Pskov Oblast bear this name:
Vasilyevskoye, Loknyansky District, Pskov Oblast, a village in Loknyansky District
Vasilyevskoye, Pushkinogorsky District, Pskov Oblast, a village in Pushkinogorsky District

Rostov Oblast
As of 2010, two rural localities in Rostov Oblast bear this name:
Vasilyevsky, Belokalitvinsky District, Rostov Oblast, a khutor in Ilyinskoye Rural Settlement of Belokalitvinsky District
Vasilyevsky, Kamensky District, Rostov Oblast, a settlement in Bogdanovskoye Rural Settlement of Kamensky District

Saratov Oblast
As of 2010, one rural locality in Saratov Oblast bears this name:
Vasilyevsky, Saratov Oblast, a settlement in Kalininsky District

Smolensk Oblast
As of 2010, three rural localities in Smolensk Oblast bear this name:
Vasilyevskoye, Gagarinsky District, Smolensk Oblast, a selo in Sergo-Ivanovskoye Rural Settlement of Gagarinsky District
Vasilyevskoye, Safonovsky District, Smolensk Oblast, a selo in Vasilyevskoye Rural Settlement of Safonovsky District
Vasilyevskoye, Tyomkinsky District, Smolensk Oblast, a village in Vasilyevskoye Rural Settlement of Tyomkinsky District

Stavropol Krai
As of 2010, one rural locality in Stavropol Krai bears this name:
Vasilyevsky, Stavropol Krai, a khutor in Vasilyevsky Selsoviet of Kochubeyevsky District

Tver Oblast
As of 2010, six rural localities in Tver Oblast bear this name:
Vasilyevskoye, Kalininsky District, Tver Oblast, a selo in Kalininsky District
Vasilyevskoye, Kashinsky District, Tver Oblast, a village in Kashinsky District
Vasilyevskoye, Selizharovsky District, Tver Oblast, a village in Selizharovsky District
Vasilyevskoye (Novo-Yamskoye Rural Settlement), Staritsky District, Tver Oblast, a village in Staritsky District; municipally, a part of Novo-Yamskoye Rural Settlement of that district
Vasilyevskoye (Vasilyevskoye Rural Settlement), Staritsky District, Tver Oblast, a village in Staritsky District; municipally, a part of Vasilyevskoye Rural Settlement of that district
Vasilyevskoye, Zubtsovsky District, Tver Oblast, a village in Zubtsovsky District

Udmurt Republic
As of 2010, one rural locality in the Udmurt Republic bears this name:
Vasilyevskoye, Udmurt Republic, a selo in Vasilyevsky Selsoviet of Krasnogorsky District

Vladimir Oblast
As of 2010, one rural locality in Vladimir Oblast bears this name:
Vasilyevsky, Vladimir Oblast, a settlement in Melenkovsky District

Volgograd Oblast
As of 2010, one rural locality in Volgograd Oblast bears this name:
Vasilyevsky, Volgograd Oblast, a khutor in Semichensky Selsoviet of Kotelnikovsky District

Vologda Oblast
As of 2010, fifteen rural localities in Vologda Oblast bear this name:
Vasilyevskoye, Babayevsky District, Vologda Oblast, a village in Toropovsky Selsoviet of Babayevsky District
Vasilyevskoye, Domozerovsky Selsoviet, Cherepovetsky District, Vologda Oblast, a village in Domozerovsky Selsoviet of Cherepovetsky District
Vasilyevskoye, Klimovsky Selsoviet, Cherepovetsky District, Vologda Oblast, a village in Klimovsky Selsoviet of Cherepovetsky District
Vasilyevskoye, Shchetinsky Selsoviet, Cherepovetsky District, Vologda Oblast, a village in Shchetinsky Selsoviet of Cherepovetsky District
Vasilyevskoye, Sheksninsky District, Vologda Oblast, a village in Ugolsky Selsoviet of Sheksninsky District
Vasilyevskoye, Sokolsky District, Vologda Oblast, a village in Chuchkovsky Selsoviet of Sokolsky District
Vasilyevskoye, Velikoustyugsky District, Vologda Oblast, a selo in Krasavinsky Selsoviet of Velikoustyugsky District
Vasilyevskoye, Vologodsky District, Vologda Oblast, a settlement in Markovsky Selsoviet of Vologodsky District
Vasilyevskaya, Kaduysky District, Vologda Oblast, a village in Nikolsky Selsoviet of Kaduysky District
Vasilyevskaya, Kichmengsko-Gorodetsky District, Vologda Oblast, a village in Nizhneyenangsky Selsoviet of Kichmengsko-Gorodetsky District
Vasilyevskaya, Ramensky Selsoviet, Syamzhensky District, Vologda Oblast, a village in Ramensky Selsoviet of Syamzhensky District
Vasilyevskaya, Zhityevsky Selsoviet, Syamzhensky District, Vologda Oblast, a village in Zhityevsky Selsoviet of Syamzhensky District
Vasilyevskaya, Vashkinsky District, Vologda Oblast, a village in Vasilyevsky Selsoviet of Vashkinsky District
Vasilyevskaya, Maryinsky Selsoviet, Vozhegodsky District, Vologda Oblast, a village in Maryinsky Selsoviet of Vozhegodsky District
Vasilyevskaya, Mityukovsky Selsoviet, Vozhegodsky District, Vologda Oblast, a village in Mityukovsky Selsoviet of Vozhegodsky District

Voronezh Oblast
As of 2010, one rural locality in Voronezh Oblast bears this name:
Vasilyevsky, Voronezh Oblast, a settlement in Vasilyevskoye Rural Settlement of Talovsky District

Yaroslavl Oblast
As of 2010, eight rural localities in Yaroslavl Oblast bear this name:
Vasilyevskoye, Borovskoy Rural Okrug, Nekrasovsky District, Yaroslavl Oblast, a village in Borovskoy Rural Okrug of Nekrasovsky District
Vasilyevskoye, Levashovsky Rural Okrug, Nekrasovsky District, Yaroslavl Oblast, a village in Levashovsky Rural Okrug of Nekrasovsky District
Vasilyevskoye, Pervomaysky District, Yaroslavl Oblast, a village in Prechistensky Rural Okrug of Pervomaysky District
Vasilyevskoye, Poshekhonsky District, Yaroslavl Oblast, a village in Vasilyevsky Rural Okrug of Poshekhonsky District
Vasilyevskoye, Rybinsky District, Yaroslavl Oblast, a village in Mikhaylovsky Rural Okrug of Rybinsky District
Vasilyevskoye, Kurbsky Rural Okrug, Yaroslavsky District, Yaroslavl Oblast, a selo in Kurbsky Rural Okrug of Yaroslavsky District
Vasilyevskoye, Kuznechikhinsky Rural Okrug, Yaroslavsky District, Yaroslavl Oblast, a village in Kuznechikhinsky Rural Okrug of Yaroslavsky District
Vasilyevskaya, Yaroslavl Oblast, a village in Povodnevsky Rural Okrug of Myshkinsky District